Atmautluak is a census-designated place (CDP) in Bethel Census Area, Alaska, United States.  The population was 277 at the 2010 census, down from 294 in 2000.

History

The area has been traditionally been inhabited by Yup'ik Eskimo.

The community was founded in the 1960s to take advantage of high ground above flooding.  Atmautluak was incorporated in 1976, but dissolved the incorporation in 1996 in order to return to traditional native government.

Geography
Atmautluak is located at  (60.859675, -162.277616).

The village is located by the Pitmiktakik River.

Demographics

Atmautluak first appeared on the 1980 U.S. Census as an incorporated city, having incorporated in 1976. It disincorporated in 1996 and was made a census-designated place (CDP) effective as of 2000.

As of the census of 2000, there were 294 people, 60 households, and 54 families residing in the CDP. There were 64 housing units at an average density of 100.6/sq mi (38.6/km2). The racial makeup of the CDP was 4.08% White, 94.56% Native American, and 1.36% from two or more races. Hispanic or Latino of any race were 1.02% of the population.

There were 60 households, out of which 58.3% had children under the age of 18 living with them, 66.7% were married couples living together, 11.7% had a female householder with no husband present, and 10.0% were non-families. 8.3% of all households were made up of individuals, and 1.7% had someone living alone who was 65 years of age or older.  The average household size was 4.90 and the average family size was 5.22.

In the CDP, the population was spread out, with 33.3% under the age of 18, 18.4% from 18 to 24, 25.2% from 25 to 44, 17.7% from 45 to 64, and 5.4% who were 65 years of age or older.  The median age was 24 years. For every 100 females, there were 102.8 males.  For every 100 females age 18 and over, there were 120.2 males.

The median income for a household in the CDP was $37,917, and the median income for a family was $39,583. Males had a median income of $20,625 versus $8,750 for females. The per capita income for the CDP was $8,501.  About 31.6% of families and 30.3% of the population were below the poverty line, including 44.0% of those under the age of eighteen and 15.4% of those 65 or over.

Education
Lower Kuskokwim School District operates the Joann A. Alexie Memorial School. It covers grades PreK-12.  it has about 118 students.

References

External links

 Atmautluak at the Community Database Online from the Alaska Division of Community and Regional Affairs
 Maps from the Alaska Department of Labor and Workforce Development: 2000, 2010
 Information 

Census-designated places in Alaska
Census-designated places in Bethel Census Area, Alaska
Census-designated places in Unorganized Borough, Alaska
Former cities in Alaska
Road-inaccessible communities of Alaska
Populated places disestablished in 1996